Las Cuerlas is a municipality located in the province of Zaragoza, Aragon, Spain. According to the 2004 census (INE), the municipality has a population of 95 inhabitants.

This town is located close to the Laguna de Gallocanta natural lake.

References

Municipalities in the Province of Zaragoza